Vladimír Javorský (born 2 May 1962 in Ostrava) is a Czech actor. He appeared in more than forty films between 1986 and 2011.

Selected filmography

External links
 

1962 births
Living people
Actors from Ostrava
Czech male film actors
Czech male stage actors
Janáček Academy of Music and Performing Arts alumni
Czech Lion Awards winners